Speed dial is a function available on many telephone systems allowing the user to place a call by pressing a reduced number of keys.  This function is particularly useful for phone users who dial certain numbers on a regular basis.

In most cases, the user stores these numbers in the phone's memory for future use.  The speed dial numbers are usually accessed by pressing a pre-determined key or keys on the phone, followed by a one or two-digit code which the user assigns to each number; however for ease of use, on many systems a call may be placed by pressing and holding one key on the numeric keypad.

Speed dialing is also available via Custom Calling features from the Telephone Company's Central Office. The numbers are programmed by the subscriber through the standard telephone dial, and speed dial calls are placed by dialing simply the digit and waiting a few seconds on a standard rotary dial phone and an older 10 key Touch Tone phone, or by dialing the number and the # key to instantly connect the call on a modern 12 key Touch Tone phone.

Most mobile phones have a contact list feature which provides similar abilities although most have an instant call button which only requires one click.

History
The capability for speed dial historically dates at least as far back as the Number One Electronic Switching System (1ESS) in 1965. Other early "instant dialers" dating back to 1972 also included punched card machines and magnetic tape machines.

Metal–oxide–semiconductor (MOS) integrated circuit (IC) telephone technology enabled speed dialing on push-button telephones in the early 1970s. MOS memory chips were used to store phone numbers, which could then be used for speed dialing at the push of a button. This was demonstrated by the British companies Pye TMC, Marconi-Elliott and GEC in 1970. Between 1971 and 1973, the American company Bell Laboratories develop a push-button MOS telephone called the "Touch-O-Matic" phone, which could store up to 32 phone numbers. This was made possible by the low cost, low power requirements, small size and high reliability of MOS transistors, over 15,000 of which were contained on ten IC chips, including one chip for logic, one for the dial interface, and eight for memory.

See also
 Abbreviated dialing
 Speed calling
 Auto dialer

References

Telephone numbers